Holthees is a village in the former municipality of Boxmeer on the border of the Dutch provinces North Brabant and Limburg. Since 2022 it has been part of the new municipality of Land van Cuijk.

History 
The name Holthees was mentioned for the first time in 1359. It is a composition of the German words hulta (wood) and hees (forest of thicket).

The Mariakapel (Mary Chapel) was built in the 15th century between Meppen castle and village. In 1648, the chapel was boarded up. The church was returned during the French occupation (early 19th century) and restored. In October 1944, it was destroyed by war. It was rebuilt after the war. It was decommissioned in 1997, and is now used for cultural activities.

Meppen castle was built in the 15th century and extended in the mid-17th century. In the mid-18th century, it was converted into a farm.

Holthees used to provide military support during the defence of the Land of Cuijk

Gallery

References 

Populated places in North Brabant
Geography of Land van Cuijk